Wishes is a studio album by American country artist Margo Smith and her daughter, Holly. It was released via Homeland Records in 1992 and contained ten tracks. All of the songs were duets between the duo and were a collection of Christian country material. It was the duo's second album together.

Background, content and release
Margo Smith first found success as a country performer during the late 1970s. Recording for 20th Century Fox and later Warner Bros., she had major hits with songs like "There I Said It", "Don't Break the Heart That Loves You" and "Still a Woman". After her chart success faded, Smith recorded for independent record labels during the 1980s. In the early 1990s, Smith formed a Christian/gospel duo with her daughter, Holly Smith. Wishes was the duo's second album together, after their first was released in 1991. The album contained a total of ten tracks, several of which were composed by either Margo or Holly Smith. The project was cut at the Suite 16 recording studio, located in Nashville, Tennessee. Sessions were produced by Bobby All and Robin Mew.

Wishes was first released in 1992 on Homeland Records, a subsidiary of Word Records. The album was originally issued as a compact disc. In 2010, the album was re-released to digital sites via Mansion Entertainment. The album received a total of two stars from AllMusic. The album's release would bring success for the Smith duo. Their songs would later find success on contemporary Christian radio, however, no specific singles are mentioned. They would continue collaborating through the 1990s and release more music as a duo.

Track listing

Personnel
All credits are adapted from the liner notes of Just the Beginning.

Musical personnel
 Bobby All – Acoustic guitar
 Kelly Back – Electric guitar
 Glen Duncan – Fiddle
 Bruce Haynes – Background vocals, gut string guitar
 Dirk Johnson – Keyboards, piano
 Jerry Kroon – Drums
 Robin Mew – Background vocals, bass, bass guitar, gut string guitar
 Gary Prim – Piano
 Scott Sanders – Dobro, steel guitar
 Holly Smith – Background vocals, lead vocals
 Margo Smith – Background vocals, lead vocals
 John Willis – Electric guitar

Technical personnel
 Bobby All – Producer
 Jerry Kroon – Percussion
 Russell Mauldin – Conductor, string arrangements
 Robin Mew – Associate producer, engineer
 Rick Salyer – Engineer
 Jimmy Tarbutton – Engineer

Release history

References

Footnotes

Books

 
 

1992 albums
Margo Smith albums